Howard Anthony Rosenberg (born June 10, 1942) is an American television critic. He worked at The Louisville Times from 1968 through 1978 and then worked at the Los Angeles Times for 25 years where he won a Pulitzer Prize for Criticism. Rosenberg coined the term mixed martial arts, or MMA, in his review of the first Ultimate Fighting Championship event UFC 1 in Los Angeles Times on November 15, 1993.

Career
In recent years he has written the book No Time to Think: The Menace of Media Speed and the 24-Hour News Cycle with Charles S. Feldman and compiled an anthology of his works, Not So Prime Time: Chasing the Trivial on American Television. Rosenberg was a member of the Peabody Awards Board of Jurors from 1996 to 2003. He currently teaches multiple classes on television criticism as an adjunct professor at the USC School of Cinematic Arts.
Rosenberg argued:
 if one word characterizes TV-driven popular culture, it's excess – the steroidal massing that comes from going too far, artificially swelling something beyond what's natural.

The Forbes Media Guide Five Hundred, 1994 states:  
Smart and perceptive, Rosenberg crafts stylish reviews of TV shows and trends, producing columns both witty and quotable.... Tuned in to both TV and the outside world, Rosenberg provides the caviar of critiques.

Early life and education
Howard Rosenberg was born June 10, 1942, in Kansas City, Missouri.  He earned a bachelor's degree in history from the University of Oklahoma and a master's degree in political science from the University of Minnesota.

Controversy
In a column soon after the September 11, 2001 attacks, Rosenberg said that George W. Bush appeared "stiff and boyish." This led to requests for him to be fired and he stated that he received letters calling him "Osama bin Rosenberg" due to the controversy.

Personal life
Rosenberg's daughter, Kirsten Rosenberg, co-owned a vegan bakery in Washington, D.C., called Sticky Fingers and is currently the lead singer of the all-female tribute band The Iron Maidens.

References

External links

1942 births
Living people
American television critics
Pulitzer Prize for Criticism winners
University of Minnesota College of Liberal Arts alumni
University of Oklahoma alumni